Ronald Agénor was the defending champion, but did not participate this year.

Mark Koevermans won the tournament, beating Franco Davín in the final, 5–7, 6–4, 6–1.

Seeds

  Thomas Muster (second round)
  Emilio Sánchez (first round)
  Guillermo Pérez Roldán (quarterfinals)
  Jordi Arrese (semifinals)
  Franco Davín (final)
  Javier Sánchez (quarterfinals)
  Mark Koevermans (champion)
  Horacio de la Peña (second round)

Draw

Finals

Top half

Bottom half

External links
 Main draw

ATP Athens Open
Athens Open